The UEFA European Under-18 Championship 1975 Final Tournament was held in Switzerland.

Qualification

|}

Teams
The following teams qualified for the tournament:

 
 
 
 
 
 
 
 
 
 
 
 
 
  (host)

Group stage

Group A

Group B

Group C

Group D

Semifinals

Third place match

Final

External links
Results by RSSSF

UEFA European Under-19 Championship
1975
Under-18
UEFA European Under-18 Championship
UEFA European Under-18 Championship
UEFA European Under-18 Championship